Filmworks XIII: Invitation to a Suicide is an album containing a score for film by John Zorn which was released on Zorn's own label, Tzadik Records, in 2002 and features music written and recorded for a black comedy directed by Loren Marsh.

Reception

The Allmusic review by Thom Jurek awarded the album 4½ stars noting that "Invitation to a Suicide, is easily the most profound, musically complex, and emotionally compelling of all of Zorn's soundtrack world... It stands as one of his masterworks in and out of the series, and will hopefully endure as a shining star in his already vast compositional catalog".

Track listing
All compositions by John Zorn
 "Invitation To A Suicide"                  -                   4:38
 "Suicide Waltz"                            -                   4:21
 "Shifting Sands"                           -                   4:12
 "East Greenpoint Rundown"                  -                   4:08
 "Time Twist"                               -                   3:39
 "The Suicide Kid"                          -                   4:08
 "Billet Doux"                              -                   1:43
 "Suicide Blues Part 1"                      -                   4:15
 "Trance Dance"                             -                   3:13
 "Lonely Are The Dumb"                     -                   2:45
 "Moon Moods"                              -                   1:58
 "Bugsy's Jazztet"                         -                   2:12
 "Suicide Blues Part 2"                     -                   3:44
 "Roary's Waltz"                           -                   2:56
 "Getting Suicidal"                        -                   1:39
 "Final Retribution"                       -                   2:50
 "Aftermath"                               -                   3:09
 "Unjust Reward"                           -                   1:36
Recorded at Frank Booth, Brooklyn (New York) in 2002

Personnel
Marc Ribot – guitar
Rob Burger – accordion
Erik Friedlander – cello
Trevor Dunn – bass
Kenny Wollesen – vibes, marimba, drums

References

Tzadik Records soundtracks
Albums produced by John Zorn
John Zorn soundtracks
2002 soundtrack albums
Film scores